950 Ahrensa, provisional designation , is a stony Phocaea asteroid and slow rotator from the inner regions of the asteroid belt, approximately 15 kilometers in diameter. It was discovered on 1 April 1921, by German astronomer Karl Reinmuth at Heidelberg Observatory in southern Germany.

Description 

The S-type asteroid, classified as a Sa-subtype in the SMASS taxonomic scheme, is a member of the Phocaea family, a group of asteroids with similar orbital characteristics. It orbits the Sun at a distance of 2.0–2.7 AU once every 3 years and 8 months (1,334 days). Its orbit shows an eccentricity of 0.16 and is tilted by 23 degrees to the plane of the ecliptic.

A photometric lightcurve analysis at the U.S. Palmer Divide Observatory in 2009, showed that the body has an exceptionally long rotation period of 202 hours. According to the surveys carried out by the Infrared Astronomical Satellite, IRAS, the Japanese Akari satellite, and the U.S. Wide-field Infrared Survey Explorer with its subsequent NEOWISE mission, the surface of the asteroid has an albedo in the range of 0.16 to 0.23, while the Collaborative Asteroid Lightcurve Link derives an even higher value of 0.27 for the stony body.

The minor planet was named in honor of friends of the discoverer Karl Reinmuth, the Ahrens family, who helped him financially at the Heidelberg Observatory. Reinmuth also named the minor planet 909 Ulla after Ulla Ahrens, a member of this family.

References

External links 
 Lightcurve plot of 950 Ahrensa, Palmer Divide Observatory, B. D. Warner (2009)
 Asteroid Lightcurve Database (LCDB), query form (info )
 Dictionary of Minor Planet Names, Google books
 Asteroids and comets rotation curves, CdR – Observatoire de Genève, Raoul Behrend
 Discovery Circumstances: Numbered Minor Planets (1)-(5000) – Minor Planet Center
 
 

000950
Discoveries by Karl Wilhelm Reinmuth
Named minor planets
000950
000950
19210401